is a character, created and designed by Shinji Mikami, in the Dino Crisis series of action-adventure video games by Japanese company Capcom, serving as the main protagonist in the original Dino Crisis (1999) and the co-protagonist in Dino Crisis 2 (2000). "Regina" is actually just an alias of a female U.S. special forces operative, whose actual name is never disclosed.

Appearances

Dino Crisis games
In the Dino Crisis series, Regina is the codename of a member of the Secret Operation Raid Team (S.O.R.T.), a U.S. Army espionage and intelligence group. Regina operates as a weapons specialist, but often undertakes other tasks as assigned, such as gathering intelligence. In the first Dino Crisis, taking place in 2009, S.O.R.T. is assigned a mission to infiltrate a "Third Energy" research facility on Ibis Island. Upon arriving at the facility, S.O.R.T. discovers it infested with dinosaurs. Despite difficulties with the new inhabitants and the security systems of the facility, Regina and the surviving members of the team complete their mission and escaped the island.

In Dino Crisis 2, set one year later, Regina is called back into service after Third Energy has caused an entire region to be transported to a different time, leaving a prehistoric jungle in its place. Regina and a large contingent of Tactical Reconnoitering and Acquisition Team (T.R.A.T.) soldiers are sent to rescue any survivors and recover any useful data on Third Energy. The mission goes wrong from the start as the majority of the T.R.A.T. forces are massacred in their base camp. Regina and the surviving soldiers attempt to complete the mission, but arrive too late to save the surviving civilians. Succeeding in recovering the Third Energy data, Regina uses a timegate to escape, leaving the last surviving T.R.A.T. member, Dylan, behind with a promise that she would return and rescue him as soon as she could.

Other appearances
Regina has also appeared in the tactical role-playing video game Namco × Capcom, beginning on a cruise ship from Gun Survivor 4 (Resident Evil: Dead Aim), as a card in SNK vs. Capcom: Card Fighters Clash, and a playable character in Puzzle Fighter. In Resident Evil 3: Nemesis, the player can unlock her outfit with a red wig as a bonus costume for Jill Valentine. Annie also "cosplays" as Regina in Super Ultra Dead Rising 3 Arcade Remix Hyper Edition EX Plus Alpha, a downloadable content for Dead Rising 3. A figure of her was released by Yujin in the Namco × Capcom series. In the second season of the animated series Ace Attorney, a character who strongly resembles Regina named Regina Locomoti is a nod to the Dino Crisis character.

Reception
The character has been well received by video game critics, journalists and bloggers, often compared with the likes of Jill Valentine from Capcom's own Resident Evil and Lara Croft from Tomb Raider. In 1999, British magazine Arcade spotlighted Regina in the "Virtual Fox" series of articles, noting that "strangely, for a post-Lara game girl, she's not so buxom" and instead she presents the same "kind of lithe class" as Jill, and declaring that "one thing's certain - Capcom has created another female lead to die for". That same year, Official U.S. PlayStation Magazine commented: "Despite her best efforts, Regina can't dislodge her rival Jill Valentine from the number-one spot".

Reviewing Dino Crisis in 2000, IGN staff found a strong point of the game "in the form of Regina, a strong-willed, red-haired leader of the elite task force that forms the foundation of the game", despite how they have "seen her type a million times over the last few years, and the slack voice-acting". Peter Olafson from The New York Times wrote an article to tell how he cared for the "sweet, relatively normal Regina" in the game because he felt she was "not a clone of Ms. Croft or the other heavily armed fashion models that populate PC games. There flows from her a sense of relative normalcy. She is capable but vulnerable. Her dimensions, too, are relatively normal, even if her wardrobe, shamefully, is not".

In 2001, Brazil's Supergamepower chose Regina as one of the twelve "muses" of console gaming, alongside Jill and Lara among others. Years later, Ryan Reynolds from XBLA Fans wrote about Regina's "hot biker chick" looks and costume: "Characters like Chris Redfield, Jill Valentine, and Albert Wesker are loved now, but at the time of Resident Evils release, they weren’t anything special. Regina on the other hand, is far from generic. In today’s world of gritty protagonists, Regina is a breath of fresh air" Retrospectively, GamesRadar's David Meikleham listed this "red-haired vixen comfortable looking hot in 32-bit leather chic" as one of the seven "kick-ass" 1990s game characters who have vanished since, opining that while her series did not repeat the success of Resident Evil, "Regina was a strong lead. A T-rex-taming sensation, she made Jill Valentine and the rest of S.T.A.R.S. look feeble". Meikleham also included her "dino-luring lycra" combat uniform among gaming's most impractical outfits, while GamesRadar's Mikel Reparaz used her gameplay model to show that "3D games, as a rule, don’t age well". Game Informer featured her in their 2010 list of "20 Namco Vs Capcom Matches We'd Love To See", confronting her with Gon from Tekken. Geoff Cox from WhatCulture chose "Regina Is Awesome" as #1 reason to bring back Dino Crisis: "Instantly recognizable without being overly sexualized, Regina was a certified badass".

References

Action-adventure game characters
Capcom protagonists
Dino Crisis
Female characters in video games
Fictional American people in video games
Fictional female military personnel
Fictional gunfighters in video games
Fictional United States Army Special Forces personnel
Horror video game characters
Science fiction video game characters
Video game characters introduced in 1999
Woman soldier and warrior characters in video games